Alice Cary (April 26, 1820February 12, 1871) was an American poet, and the older sister of fellow poet Phoebe Cary (1824–1871).

Biography

Alice Cary was born on April 26, 1820, in Mount Healthy, Ohio, off the Miami River near Cincinnati. Her parents lived on a farm bought by Robert Cary in 1813 in what is now North College Hill, Ohio. He called the  Clovernook Farm. But Alice and her sister Phoebe were fond of reading and studied all they could.

While the sisters were raised in a Universalist household and held political and religious views that were liberal and reformist, they often attended Methodist, Presbyterian, and Congregationalist services and were friendly with ministers of all these denominations and others.  According to Phoebe,

When Alice was 17 and Phoebe 13, they began to write verses, which were printed in newspapers. Their mother had died in 1835, and two years afterward their father married again. Their stepmother was wholly unsympathetic regarding the literary aspirations of Alice and Phoebe.  For their part, while the sisters were ready and while willing to aid to the full extent of their strength in household labor, they persisted in a determination to study and write when the day's work was done. Sometimes they were refused the use of candles to the extent of their wishes, and the device of a saucer of lard with a bit of rag for a wick was their only light after the rest of the family had retired.

Alice's first major poem, "The Child of Sorrow", was published in 1838 and was praised by influential critics including Edgar Allan Poe, Rufus Wilmot Griswold, and Horace Greeley. Alice and her sister were included in the influential anthology The Female Poets of America prepared by Rufus Griswold. Griswold encouraged publishers to put forth a collection of the sisters' poetry, even asking John Greenleaf Whittier to provide a preface. Whittier refused, believing their poetry did not need his endorsement, and also noting a general dislike for prefaces as a method to "pass off by aid of a known name, what otherwise would not pass current". In 1849, a Philadelphia publisher accepted the book, Poems of Alice and Phoebe Cary, and Griswold wrote the preface, left unsigned. By the spring of 1850, Alice and Griswold were often corresponding through letters which were often flirtatious. This correspondence ended by the summer of that year.

The anthology made Alice and Phoebe well known, and in 1850 they moved to New York City, where they devoted themselves to writing and garnered much fame. There, they also hosted receptions on Sunday evenings that drew notable figures including P. T. Barnum, Elizabeth Cady Stanton, John Greenleaf Whittier, Horace Greeley, Bayard Taylor and his wife, Richard and Elizabeth Stoddard, Robert Dale Owen, Oliver Johnson, Mary Mapes Dodge, Mrs. Croly, Mrs. Victor, Edwin H. Chapin, Henry M. Field, Charles F. Deems, Samuel Bowles, Thomas B. Aldrich, Anna E. Dickinson, George Ripley, Madame Le Vert, Henry Wilson, Justin McCarthy; in short, all the noted contemporary names in the different departments of literature and art might fairly be added to the list.

Alice wrote for the Atlantic Monthly, Harper's, Putnam's Magazine, the New York Ledger, the Independent, and other literary periodicals. Her articles, whether prose or poetry, were gathered subsequently into volumes which were received well in the United States and abroad. She also wrote novels and poems which did not make their first appearance in periodicals.  Among her prose works were The Clovernook Children and Snow Berries, a Book for Young Folks.

In 1868, Horace Greeley wrote a brief joint biography of Alice and Phebe (as he spelled her name).

 
Alice died of tuberculosis in 1871 in New York at age 50. The pallbearers at her funeral included P. T. Barnum and Horace Greeley.  Alice Cary is buried alongside her sister Phoebe in Green-Wood Cemetery, Brooklyn, New York.

The Cary Home stands today on the east side of Hamilton Avenue (US 127), on the campus of the Clovernook Center for the Blind and Visually Impaired in North College Hill.

Works 
Poems of Alice and Phoebe Cary  (1849)
A Memorial of Alice and Phoebe Cary With Some of Their Later Poems, compiled and edited by Mary Clemmer Ames (1873)
The Last Poems of Alice and Phoebe Cary, compiled and edited by Mary Clemmer Ames (1873)
Ballads for Little Folk by Alice and Phoebe Cary, compiled and edited by Mary Clemmer Ames (1873)

Note: In early volumes, "Cary" was spelled "Carey" in and on Phoebe and Alice Cary's books, and later editions and volumes changed the spelling to "Cary".

References

External links

 
 
 Alice Cary (1820–1871)
 Cary Cottage
 Cary Oak
 Index entry at Poets' Corner for Alice Cary
 Green-Wood Cemetery Burial Search
 Works with text by Alice Cary on IMSLP

1820 births
1871 deaths
Writers from Cincinnati
19th-century deaths from tuberculosis
Burials at Green-Wood Cemetery
American women poets
19th-century American poets
19th-century American women writers
People from Mount Healthy, Ohio
People from North College Hill, Ohio
Tuberculosis deaths in New York (state)